Ptyoiulus is a genus of millipedes in the family Parajulidae. There are about seven described species in Ptyoiulus.

Species
These seven species belong to the genus Ptyoiulus:
 Ptyoiulus conveanus Chamberlin, 1943
 Ptyoiulus coveanus Chamberlin, 1943
 Ptyoiulus ectenes (Bollman, 1887)
 Ptyoiulus georgiensis Chamberlin, 1943
 Ptyoiulus impressus (Say, 1821)
 Ptyoiulus montanus
 Ptyoiulus pennsylvanicus (Brandt, 1840)

References

Further reading

 
 

Julida
Articles created by Qbugbot